The Lord High Chancellor, literally Chancellor of the Realm, was a prominent and influential office in Sweden, from 1538 until 1799, excluding periods when the office was out of use. The office holder was a member of the Privy Council. From 1634, the Lord High Chancellor was one of five Great Officers of the Realm, who were the most prominent members of the Privy Council and headed a governmental branch each—the Lord High Chancellor headed the Privy Council. In 1792, more than a century after the office's abolishment in 1680, it was revived but was then finally abolished seven years later in 1799.

Origins
During the Middle Ages, from the 13th century, the "chancellor of the king" was a close confidant of the king. The chancellor was in general a man of the church, and one part of his duty was to aid the king during negotiations with foreign powers. In 1560, during Eric XIV's reign, Nils Gyllenstierna became the first to receive the title Rikskansler.

Function
The Lord High Chancellor was appointed by the King and was assigned to ensure that the orders of the King and the Riksdag of the Estates were followed. Along the way, the assignments of the chancellor increased to the amount that a chancellery, the Privy Council, had to be established. In 1634, the five Great Officers of the Realm were introduced as the most powerful among the Privy Council members. The Chancellor was fourth in rank among these. Albeit fourth in rank, the Lord High Chancellor became the most important figure in the Privy Council. The Chancellor was responsible for maintaining relations with foreign powers and especially Axel Oxenstierna possessed massive influence during his tenure as Chancellor (1612–1654), when he more or less had the role of a head of government.

Abolition and revival of the office
In 1680, Charles XI abolished the office and inaugurated a new position instead – "President of the Chancellery" (Swedish: Kanslipresident). In 1792, during the minority reign of Gustav IV Adolph the office of Rikskansler was revived, but it was removed once again in 1799.

Lord High Chancellors of Sweden

First creation

Second creation

See also
 King in Council (Sweden)
 Prime Minister of Sweden
 List of prime ministers of Sweden

References

External links

Ch
1538 establishments in Sweden